The Catholic University of Santos (UniSantos or Católica de Santos) is a Brazilian private and non-profit Catholic university, located in Santos, São Paulo, the first university in the region of the city.  It is one of the largest and most prestigious higher education institutions in Brazil, with many of its courses among the best ranked in the country, including Law, International Relations, Journalism, History, Psychology, Business Administration and Engineering. It is maintained by the Catholic Diocese of Santos.

History
UNISANTOS's history began in 1951 when the Society was founded by Visconde de São Leopoldo. The initial goal was to establish the School of Law. Thereafter, the university expanded to include a school of Philosophy, Sciences and Letters, Communication, Economics and Business, School of Architecture, School of Social Work, School of Nursing, School of Pharmacy and Biochemistry, and School of Engineering.

On February 6, 1986, the Catholic UNISANTOS was recognized and became the first university in the region, under the auspices of the then Minister Marco Antônio Maciel under approval process 3924/76. Currently consisting of five learning centres, the UNISANTOS maintains more than 40 undergraduate courses, including programmes in Technology, five Masters courses recommended by Capes and MEC (Education, Law, Business Management, Computer Science and Public Health), science and the arts, and dozens of other courses linked to a humanistic tradition.

As a member of the Brazilian Association of Community Universities, the UNISANTOS provides part of their revenue to provide funding for scholarships, free hospital visits, psychology clinics, and legal assistance, among others. Additionally, it maintains the Open University for the Elderly, a pioneer project in the region.

Located in the littoral zone of the State of São Paulo, region known as "Baixada Santista," the law school of the Catholic UniSantos is among the best in the State, according to the Federal Council of the Bar Association of Brazil. The university is the only one to get the label "Federal Bar Association recommends," in three editions in which it was granted. It is also recognized for the high rate of students who pass the examination stage of the OAB and the Public Defender and Prosecutor, in addition to tendering for public service careers in the legal area as Magistrates, Prosecutors at the federal, state and municipal levels.

The UNISANTOS has an agreement to exchange students with foreign institutions located in Portugal, Spain, Germany, Mexico and Costa Rica.

References

External links
 Official website 

Educational institutions established in 1951
Santos
1951 establishments in Brazil
Catholic universities and colleges in Brazil